Clepsis rolandriana is a species of moth of the family Tortricidae. It is found in Germany, Austria, Italy, Slovenia, Bosnia and Herzegovina, Hungary and Russia.

The wingspan is 20–24 mm for males and 18–21 mm for females. Adults have been recorded on wing from June to July.

The larvae feed on Veratrum album. Larvae can be found in May.

References

Moths described in 1758
Taxa named by Carl Linnaeus
Clepsis